{{DISPLAYTITLE:Conway group Co1}}

In the area of modern algebra known as group theory, the Conway group Co1 is a sporadic simple group of order
   221395472111323
 = 4157776806543360000
 ≈ 4.

History and properties
Co1 is one of the 26 sporadic groups and was discovered by John Horton Conway in 1968.  It is the largest of the three sporadic Conway groups and can be obtained as the quotient of Co0 (group of automorphisms of the Leech lattice Λ that fix the origin) by its center, which consists of the scalar matrices ±1.  It also appears at the top of the automorphism group of the even 26-dimensional unimodular lattice II25,1. Some rather cryptic comments in Witt's collected works suggest that he found the Leech lattice and possibly the order of its automorphism group in unpublished work in 1940.

The outer automorphism group is trivial and the Schur multiplier has order 2.

Involutions
Co0 has 4 conjugacy classes of involutions; these collapse to 2 in Co1, but there are 4-elements in Co0 that correspond to a third class of involutions in Co1.

An image of a dodecad has a centralizer of type 211:M12:2, which is contained in a maximal subgroup of type 211:M24.

An image of an octad or 16-set has a centralizer of the form 21+8.O8+(2), a maximal subgroup.

Representations 

The smallest faithful permutation representation  of Co1 is on the 98280 pairs {v,–v} of norm 4 vectors.

There is a matrix representation of dimension 24 over the field .

The centralizer of an involution of type 2B in the monster group is of the form 21+24Co1.

The Dynkin diagram of the even Lorentzian unimodular lattice II1,25 is isometric to the (affine) Leech lattice Λ, so the group of diagram automorphisms is split extension Λ,Co0 of affine isometries of the Leech lattice.

Maximal subgroups 

Co2 
3.Suz:2    The lift to Aut(Λ) = Co0 fixes a complex structure or changes it to the complex conjugate structure. Also, top of Suzuki chain.
211:M24 Image of monomial subgroup from Aut(Λ), that subgroup stabilizing the standard frame of 48 vectors of form (±8,023) .
Co3
21+8.O8+(2)  centralizer of involution class 2A (image of octad from Aut(Λ))
Fi21:S3 ≈ U6(2):S3 The lift to Aut(Λ) is the symmetry group of a coplanar hexagon of 6 type 2 points.
(A4 × G2(4)):2   in Suzuki chain.
22+12:(A8 × S3)
24+12.(S3 × 3.S6)
32.U4(3).D8
36:2.M12 (holomorph of ternary Golay code)
(A5 × J2):2  in Suzuki chain
31+4:2.PSp4(3).2
(A6 × U3(3)).2  in Suzuki chain
33+4:2.(S4 × S4)
A9 × S3  in Suzuki chain
(A7 × L2(7)):2  in Suzuki chain
(D10 × (A5 × A5).2).2
51+2:GL2(5)
53:(4 × A5).2
72:(3 × 2.S4)
52:2A5

References 

 

 Reprinted in

External links 
 MathWorld: Conway Groups
 Atlas of Finite Group Representations: Co1 version 2
 Atlas of Finite Group Representations: Co1 version 3

Sporadic groups
John Horton Conway